The hoatzin or hoactzin, (Opisthocomus hoazin), is a species of tropical bird found in swamps, riparian forests, and mangroves of the Amazon and the Orinoco basins in South America. It is the only extant species in the genus Opisthocomus which is the only extant genus in the Opisthocomidae family under the order of Opisthocomiformes. The taxonomic position of this family has been greatly debated by specialists, and is still far from clear.

It is notable for having chicks that have claws on two of their wing digits.

Description 
 
It has an unfeathered blue face with maroon eyes, and its head is topped by a spiky, rufous crest. The long, sooty-brown tail is bronze green tipped broad whitish or buff band at the end. The upper parts are dark, sooty-brown-edged buff on the wing coverts, and streaked buff on the mantle and nape. The under parts are buff, while the crissum (the undertail coverts surrounding the cloaca), primaries, underwing coverts and flanks are rich rufous-chestnut, but this is mainly visible when it opens its wings.

It is a noisy bird, it makes a variety of hoarse calls, including groans, croaks, hisses and grunts. These calls are often associated with body movements, such as wing spreading.

Young wing claws 
Hoatzin chicks have two claws on each wing. Immediately on hatching, they can use these claws, and their oversized feet, to scramble around the tree branches without falling into the water. When predators such as the great black hawk attack a hoatzin nesting colony, the adults fly noisily about, trying to divert the predator's attention, while the chicks move away from the nest and hide among the thickets. If discovered, however, they drop into the water and swim under the surface to escape, then later use their clawed wings to climb back to the safety of the nest.

This has inevitably led to comparisons to the fossil bird Archaeopteryx, but the characteristic is rather an autapomorphy, possibly caused by an atavism toward the dinosaurian finger claws, whose developmental genetics ("blueprint") presumably is still in the avian genome. Since Archaeopteryx had three functional claws on each wing, some earlier systematists speculated that the hoatzin was descended from it, because nestling hoatzins have two functional claws on each wing. Modern researchers, however, hypothesize that the young hoatzin's claws are of more recent origin, and may be a secondary adaptation from its frequent need to leave the nest and climb about in dense vines and trees well before it can fly.

Taxonomy, systematics and evolution 

The genus name Opisthocomus comes from Ancient Greek  ópisthokomos derived from  ópisthe ( ópisthen before a consonant) "behind" and  kómē "hair" altogether meaning "long hair behind" referring to its large crest.

The hoatzin was originally described in 1776 by German zoologist Statius Müller. There has been much debate about the hoatzin's relationships with other birds. Because of its distinctness it has been given its own family, the Opisthocomidae, and its own suborder, the Opisthocomi. At various times, it has been allied with such taxa as the tinamous, the Galliformes (gamebirds), the rails, the bustards, seriemas, sandgrouse, doves, turacos and other Cuculiformes, and mousebirds. A whole genome sequencing study published in 2014 places the hoatzin as the sister taxon of a clade composed of Gruiformes (cranes) and Charadriiformes (plovers).

In 2015, genetic research indicated that the hoatzin is the last surviving member of a bird line that branched off in its own direction 64 million years ago, shortly after the extinction event that killed the non-avian dinosaurs.

Fossil record

With respect to other material evidence, an undisputed fossil record of a close hoatzin relative is specimen UCMP 42823, a single cranium backside. It is of Miocene origin and was recovered in the upper Magdalena River Valley, Colombia in the well known fauna of La Venta. This has been placed into a distinct, less derived genus, Hoazinoides, but clearly would be placed into the same family as the extant species. It markedly differs in that the cranium of the living hoatzin is characteristic, being much domed, rounded, and shortened, and that these autapomorphies were less pronounced in the Miocene bird. Müller discussed these findings in the light of the supposed affiliation of the hoatzins and the Galliformes, which was the favored hypothesis at that time, but had been controversial almost since its inception. He cautioned, however, "that Hoazinoides by no means establishes a phyletic junction point with other galliforms" for obvious reasons, as we know today. Anything other than the primary findings of Müller are not to be expected in any case, as by the time of Hoazinoides, essentially all modern bird families are either known or believed to have been present and distinct. Going further back in time, the Late Eocene or Early Oligocene (some 34 million years ago) Filholornis from France has also been considered "proof" of a link between the hoatzin and the gamebirds. The fragmentary fossil Onychopteryx from the Eocene of Argentina and the quite complete but no less enigmatic Early-Middle Eocene (Ypresian-Lutetian, some 48 million years ago) Foro panarium are sometimes used to argue for a hoatzin-cuculiform (including turacos) link. But as demonstrated above, this must be considered highly speculative, if not as badly off the mark as the relationship with Cracidae discussed by Miller.

The earliest record of the order Opisthocomiformes is Protoazin parisiensis, from the latest Eocene (approximately 34 mya) of Romainville, France. The holotype and only known specimen is NMB PG.70, consisting of partial coracoid, partial scapula, and partial pedal phalanx. According to the phylogenetic analysis performed by the authors, Namibiavis, although later, is more basal than Protoazin. Opisthocomiforms seem to have been much more widespread in the past, with the present South American distribution being only a relic. By the Early to Middle Miocene, they were probably extinct in Europe already, as formations dated to this time and representing fluvial or lacustrine palaeoenvironments, in which the hoatzin thrives today, have yielded dozens of bird specimens, but no opisthocomiform. A possible explanation to account for the extinction of Protoazin between the Late Eocene and the Early Miocene in Europe, and of Namibiavis after the Middle Miocene of Sub-Saharan Africa is the arrival of arboreal carnivorans, predation by which could have had a devastating effect on the local opisthocomiforms, if they were as poor flyers and had similarly vulnerable nesting strategies as today's hoatzins. Felids and viverrids first arrived in Europe from Asia after the Turgai Sea closed, marking the boundary between the Eocene and the Oligocene. None of these predators, and for the matter, no placental predator at all was present in South America before the Great American Interchange 3 mya, which could explain the survival of the hoatzin there. In addition to being the earliest fossil record of an opisthocomiform, Protoazin was also the earliest find of one (1912), but it was forgotten for more than a century, being described only in 2014.

Hoazinavis is an extinct genus of early opisthocomiform from Late Oligocene and Early Miocene (about 24–22 mya) deposits of Brazil. It was collected in 2008 from the Tremembé Formation of São Paulo, Brazil. It was first named by Gerald Mayr, Herculano Alvarenga and Cécile Mourer-Chauviré in 2011 and the type species is Hoazinavis lacustris.

Namibiavis is another extinct genus of early opisthocomoform from early Middle Miocene (approximately 16 mya) deposits of Namibia. It was collected from Arrisdrift, southern Namibia. It was first named by Cécile Mourer-Chauviré in 2003 and the type species is Namibiavis senutae.

Behavior

Feeding 
The hoatzin is a folivore - it eats the leaves (and to a lesser degree fruits and flowers) of the plants that grow in the marshy and riverine habitats where it lives. It clambers around clumsily along the branches, and being quite tame (though they become stressed by frequent visits), often allows close approach and is reluctant to flush. The hoatzin uses a leathery bump on the bottom of its crop to help balance itself on the branches. Once it was thought that the species could eat the leaves of only  arums and mangroves, but the species is now known to consume the leaves of more than fifty species. One study undertaken in Venezuela found that the hoatzin's diet was 82% leaves, 10% flowers, and 8% fruit. Any feeding of insects or other animal matter is purely accidental.

One of this species' many peculiarities is that it has a digestive system unique amongst birds. Hoatzins host special bacteria in the front part of the gut that break down and fermentation the vegetable material they consume, much as cattle and other ruminants do. Unlike ruminants, however, which possess the rumen (a specialized stomach for bacterial fermentation), the hoatzin has an unusually large crop, folded in two chambers, and a large, multi-chambered lower esophagus. Its stomach chamber and gizzard are much smaller than in other birds. Its crop is so large as to displace the flight muscles and keel of the sternum, much to the detriment of their flight capacity. A hoatzin's meal takes up to 45 hours to pass through its body.

Because of aromatic compounds in the leaves they consume and the bacterial fermentation, the bird has a disagreeable, manure-like odor and is only hunted by humans for food in times of dire need, local people also call it the "stinkbird" because of it.

Breeding 
Hoatzins are seasonal breeders, breeding during the rainy season, the exact timing of which varies across its range. Hoatzins are gregarious and nest in small colonies, laying two or three eggs in a stick nest in a tree hanging over water in seasonally flooded forests.

The chicks are fed on regurgitated fermented food.

Relationship with humans
In Brazil, indigenous peoples sometimes collect the eggs for food, and the adults are occasionally hunted, but in general this is rare, as hoatzin meat is reputed to have a bad taste. While its preferred habitats of mangrove and riverine forest are disappearing quickly in some regions, it is less threatened than the Amazon rainforest, which is a primary target for deforestation. The hoatzin therefore remains fairly common in a large part of its range. The hoatzin is the national bird of Guyana.

See also
 Turaco, a convergently evolved bird in the order Musophagiformes which is a large-crested, arboreal, mainly herbivorous bird whose nestlings also use wing claws for climbing.

Footnotes

References

External links 

 Cornell Lab of Ornithology: Mystery Birds: Hoatzin Adults and Young. Retrieved 2008-JUN-16.
 Hoatzin videos, photos & sounds on the Internet Bird Collection.

Opisthocomiformes
Birds of the Guianas
Birds of the Amazon Basin
Extant Eocene first appearances
Folivores
Herbivorous vertebrates
Herbivorous animals
Birds described in 1776
Birds of Brazil
Taxa named by Philipp Ludwig Statius Müller